Thyrea is a genus of lichen-forming fungi in the family Lichinaceae. It contains four species that have been accepted by Species Fungorum. The genus was circumscribed by Italian lichenologist Abramo Bartolommeo Massalongo in 1856, with Thyrea plectospora assigned as the type species.

Species
 Thyrea confusa 
 Thyrea girardii 
 Thyrea plectopsora 
 Thyrea porphyrella  – South America

References

Lichinomycetes
Ascomycota genera
Lichen genera
Taxa named by Abramo Bartolommeo Massalongo
Taxa described in 1856